Annamoriah is an unincorporated community in Calhoun County, West Virginia, United States.  It lies along West Virginia Route 5 to the west of the town of Grantsville, the county seat of Calhoun County.   Its elevation is 994 feet (303 m). Their post office closed in 1988.

References

Unincorporated communities in Calhoun County, West Virginia
Unincorporated communities in West Virginia